Her Game is a lost 1919 silent drama directed by Frank Hall Crane and starring Florence Reed and Conway Tearle.

Cast
Florence Reed - Carol Raymond
Conway Tearle - Alan Rutherford/Bruce Armitage
Jed Prouty - Bobby McAllister
Florence Billings—Mildred Manning
Mathilde Brundage - The Dragoness

References

External links
 Her Game @ IMDb.com

1919 films
American silent feature films
Lost American films
1919 drama films
American black-and-white films
Silent American drama films
1919 lost films
Lost drama films
1910s American films